Khastyn Jamgan (born 15 October 1950) is a Mongolian boxer. He competed in the men's light welterweight event at the 1980 Summer Olympics.

References

External links
 

1950 births
Living people
Mongolian male boxers
Olympic boxers of Mongolia
Boxers at the 1980 Summer Olympics
Place of birth missing (living people)
Asian Games medalists in boxing
Boxers at the 1978 Asian Games
Asian Games bronze medalists for Mongolia
Medalists at the 1978 Asian Games
Light-welterweight boxers
20th-century Mongolian people
21st-century Mongolian people